Ricardo Oliveira dos Santos (born November 3, 1982 in Presidente Epitácio), known as Ricardo Oliveira, is a Brazilian footballer who plays as midfielder.

Career statistics

References

External links

1982 births
Living people
Brazilian footballers
Association football midfielders
Campeonato Brasileiro Série C players
Grêmio Catanduvense de Futebol players
Guarani FC players